Samantha Dunn (born 18 June 1964) is a former Australian politician. She was a Greens member of the Victorian Legislative Council, representing Eastern Metropolitan Region from 2014 to 2018. She lost her seat at the 2018 state election, and subsequently resigned from the party.

She was previously a Yarra Ranges Shire councillor, representing Lyster Ward from 2005 until her election to the Upper House in 2014, being successfully reelected in 2008 and 2012.  In 2012 she achieved a 53% primary vote, a record for any Greens candidate in Australia.  During her time as a local Councillor she was President of the VLGA and the Eastern Transport Coalition.

References

External links
 Official website
 Parliamentary voting record of Samantha Dunn at Victorian Parliament Tracker

1964 births
Living people
Australian Greens members of the Parliament of Victoria
Members of the Victorian Legislative Council
21st-century Australian politicians
Women members of the Victorian Legislative Council
21st-century Australian women politicians